The Power Macintosh 9600 (also sold with additional server software as the Apple Workgroup Server 9650) is a personal computer that is a part of Apple Computer's Power Macintosh series of Macintosh computers. It was introduced in February 1997 alongside the Power Macintosh 7300 and 8600, and replaced the Power Macintosh 9500 as Apple's flagship desktop computer.

The 9600 was replaced by the Power Macintosh G3 Mini Tower in Apple's product lineup in November 1997, with sales of the 9600 continuing until March 1998.

Models 
When introduced, the Power Macintosh 9600 was available with three processor configurations: single-processor 200 MHz, dual-processor 200 MHz, and single-processor 233 MHz. The line was updated in August 1997 with a single-processor 300 MHz or 350 MHz "Mach 5" 604ev with a larger L2 cache, priced at $4,500 and $5,300, respectively.  An updated Workgroup Server 9650 was introduced at the same time with a 350 MHz CPU, and could be ordered pre-configured as an application server, AppleShare server or Internet server, with prices ranging from $6,800 to $7,500 USD depending on the software package chosen.

The 350 MHz model was initially discontinued in October due to CPU supply problems, but reintroduced on February 17, 1998 when the 300 MHz model was discontinued in favor of the new Power Macintosh G3 Mini Tower.  While the G3 was faster, its expandability was only on par with the 8600, so the 9600 was kept available until March for users that required it.

Hardware 

The 9600 came in the same new case as the 8600, but was internally very similar to the 9500 that preceded it, with 12 memory slots and 6 PCI expansion card slots instead of the 8 memory and 3 PCI slots on the 8600. The 9600 used the new PowerPC 604e CPU, an enhanced version of the 9500 604. 

Like its predecessor, the Power Macintosh 9600 has no built-in video; instead, it shipped with an 8 MB IXMICRO TwinTurbo 128-bit PCI video card installed. 

The Power Macintosh 9600/350 was the most powerful Mac ever in Apple's four-digit model numbering system, the last multiprocessor Mac for three years, and the last model with six or more expansion slots until the 2019 Mac Pro. No version of OS X was officially supported by Apple on the 9600; its installation and use required the use of the third-party software solution XPostFacto. Mac OS X 10.3 or 10.4 was only possible with a G3 processor upgrade installed, and OS X 10.5 was possible with a G4 upgrade. The 9600 was part of the final generation of Macs to ship with a SCSI hard drive as a standard feature; subsequent Macs adopted IDE for the internal hard drive bus.

Technical specifications 
All are obsolete.

Timeline

Notes

References

External links

 Power Macintosh 9600 at Low End Mac
 EveryMac.com:
 Power Macintosh:
 9600/200
 9600/200MP
 9600/233
 9600/300
 9600/350

9600
9600
Macintosh towers
Computer-related introductions in 1997